Monroe Township is a township in Livingston County, in the U.S. state of Missouri.

Monroe Township has the name of James Monroe.

References

Townships in Missouri
Townships in Livingston County, Missouri